Treschenu-Creyers (Vivaro-Alpine: Treschanuts e Creiers) is a former commune in the Drôme department in southeastern France. On 1 January 2019, it was merged into the commune Châtillon-en-Diois.

Population

See also
Communes of the Drôme department
Parc naturel régional du Vercors

References

Former communes of Drôme